Mahatma Gandhi Road (MG Road), popularly known as Bandar Road, is a boulevard and major road in the Indian city of Vijayawada.The road starts at Benz Circle, busiest traffic circle in the city and continues to Avatar Park, where it connects to Eluru Road which is also a major road. It runs almost parallel to the Bandar Canal. The National Highway 9 (NH 9) runs parallel to this road on the other side of the Bandar Canal, merging into Bandar Road at Benz Circle. The name "Bandar" was originally the name of Machilipatnam Road, which the current Bandar Road intersects.

Its official name comes from Mahatma Gandhi, the inspirational leader of the Indian Independence Movement in the early twentieth century.

History

Bandar Road's has an average width of  although it is not of uniform width throughout. This road's creation altered the landscape of Vijayawada and was the catalyst for the erection of Multiplexes and the Prominent Building.

Culture
MG road is the highly influential road in the city both culturally and economically. It is the destination for the city people for fun and entertainment because of its high end shopping malls, theaters, hotels, restaurants, food courts and cafes. It is also seat of Collector Office, Vijayawada. Indira Gandhi Stadium, Bapu Museum, Swaraj Maidan (PWD Grounds) are located on this road. Since December 2014, a midnight food court is organised on this road near Indira Gandhi Stadium until 2:30 am. and film theaters operate until 2 am, which results in crowd flow whole day. Many events in the city happens on this road like Happy Sunday and other people gatherings, marathons. City exhibition, Book Festival and other premium events are organised in PWD Grounds every year.

Controversy
In  December 2005, Vijayawada city officials decided to widen the road to  without warning. This decision involved the immediate demolition of one wall of the Akashvani (All India Air) radio station and a neighboring bus shelter. The radio station, given no forewarning of this road expansion prior to the project's initiation, requested that the council order monetary compensation for the property's  subsequent devaluation; and immediate reconstruction of the demolished wall.

References 

Roads in Vijayawada